Screw It! is the second album by the American band Danger Danger, released in 1991. "Monkey Business" peaked at No. 42 on the UK Singles Chart.

Production
The album was produced by Bruno Ravel and Steve West. It was recorded at New River Studios in Fort Lauderdale, Florida. Ginger Lynn provided the moans on "Yeah, You Want It!"

Critical reception

The Calgary Herald noted that "most of the music and pedantic lyrics tend to irritate instead of stimulate." The Chicago Tribune deemed "Yeah, You Want It!" an "offensive, date-rape anthem."

AllMusic wrote that "the music overall appears to have been constructed in hopes of pleasing both the mainstream pop audience and hair-sprayed headbangers."

Track listing 
All songs written by Steve West and Bruno Ravel, except for where noted.
 "Ginger Snaps (Intro) 
 "Monkey Business" - 5:22
 "Slipped Her the Big One" (West, Andy Timmons) - 5:32
 "C'est Loupé (Prelude) / Beat the Bullet" - 4:53
 "I Still Think About You" - 4:36
 "Get Your Shit Together" - 4:41
 "Crazy Nites" - 4:14
 "Puppet Show" - 1:20
 "Everybody Wants Some" - 4:15
 "Don't Blame It on Love" - 3:58
 "Comin' Home" - 4:39
 "Horny S.O.B." - 3:22
 "Find Your Way Back Home" - 6:14
 "Yeah, You Want It!" - 3:34
 "D.F.N.S." - 0:50

Personnel

Band
Ted Poley - lead and backing vocals
Andy Timmons - electric and acoustic guitars, backing vocals
Kasey Smith - keyboards
Bruno Ravel - 4- and 12-string basses, backing vocals, cello
Steve West - drums, out of tune vocals

Guests
Gary Cherone, Nuno Bettencourt, Pat Badger - backing vocals (2), rap (13)
Ginger Lynn: voice
Eddy Conard: percussion
Todd "T-Boy" Confessore
Mom - Violin
Dad - Violin
Bruno- Violin
Koen VanBaal
Ravel String Quartet

References

Danger Danger albums
1991 albums
Epic Records albums